Abadi may refer to:
Abadi (newspaper), a defunct Indonesian daily newspaper
Abadi (surname), a list of people with the name
Abadi (rural locality), a type of place in Iran
Abadi, Khuzestan, a village in Iran
Abadi, Razavi Khorasan, a village in Iran